This is a list of Catholic churches in Belgium.

Cathedrals
See: List of Catholic cathedrals in Belgium
Cathedral of Our Lady (Antwerp)
St. Salvator's Cathedral, Bruges
Cathedral of St. Michael and St. Gudula, Brussels
St Bavo's Cathedral, Ghent
St. Quentin Cathedral, Hasselt
Liège Cathedral
St. Rumbold's Cathedral, Mechelen
St Aubin's Cathedral, Namur
Tournai Cathedral

Former
Notre Dame de Dinant, Dinant, Namur
St. Donatian's Cathedral, Bruges
St. Lambert's Cathedral, Liège
St Martin's Cathedral, Ypres

Basilicas
Basilica of Our Lady of Hanswijk, Mechelen, Antwerp
Basilica of Our Lady of Scherpenheuvel, Scherpenheuvel-Zichem, Flemish Brabant
Basilica of Our Lady of Tongre, Chièvres, Hainaut
Basilica of the Holy Blood, Bruges, West Flanders
Basilica of the Sacred Heart, Brussels
 Abbey Basilica of St Andrew, Zevenkerken, West Flanders
Basilica of Saint Maternus, Walcourt, Namur
Onze-Lieve-Vrouw ten Troost, Vilvoorde, Flemish Brabant
Oostakker Basilica, East Flanders
Virga Jesse Basilica, Hasselt, Limburg

Chapels
Chapel of the Resurrection, Brussels
 Chapel of Saint Brigid, Fosses-la-Ville, Namur

Churches

Antwerp
In the Diocese of Antwerp:
Recollects Convent, Antwerp
St. Charles Borromeo Church, Antwerp
St. Andrew's Church, Antwerp
St. James' Church, Antwerp
St. Paul's Church, Antwerp
St Walburga Church (Antwerp)
In the Archdiocese of Mechelen-Brussels:
Church of Our Lady of Leliendaal, Mechelen

Brussels
In the Archdiocese of Mechelen-Brussels:
 Chapel Church
 Collegiate Church of St. Peter and St. Guido
 Convent Van Maerlant
 Church of Our Blessed Lady of the Sablon
 Church of Our Lady of Laeken
 Church of St. Augustine, Forest
 Church of St. Clement, Watermael-Boitsfort
 Church of St. James on Coudenberg
 Church of St. John Berchmans, Brussels
 Church of St. John the Baptist, Molenbeek
 Church of St. John the Baptist at the Béguinage
 Saint Catherine's Church, Brussels
 Saint Joseph's Church, Brussels
 Saint Mary's Royal Church
 Temple of the Augustinians, Brussels

East Flanders
In the Diocese of Ghent:
 Drongen Abbey
 Saint Laurentius Church
Saint Michael's Church, Ghent
Saint Nicholas' Church, Ghent
 St. Stefanus, Ghent
 Holy Cross Church, Heusden
 Church of Our Lady, Melsele
 Church of Our Lady (Temse)

Flemish Brabant
In the Archdiocese of Mechelen-Brussels:
 Sint-Anna Church (Itterbeek)
St. Peter's Church, Leuven
 Saint Quentin's Church
 St. Leonard's Church, Zoutleeuw

Hainaut
In the Diocese of Tournai:
 Church of Saint Quentin, Tournai
 Church of Saint-Sulpice, Jumet

Liège
In the Diocese of Liege:
Seven collegiate churches of Liège
St Bartholomew's Church, Liège
Church of St. Denis (Liège)
St James's Church, Liège
Church of Saint John the Evangelist, Liège
St Peter's Church, Liège
Holy Cross Church, Liège

Limburg
In the Diocese of Hasselt:
Church of Saint Anne, Aldeneik
 Sint-Laurenskerk, Bocholt
 St. Peter in Chains Church (Beringen)

Luxembourg
In the Diocese of Namur:
 St. Peter's Church, Melreux

Walloon Brabant
In the Archdiocese of Mechelen-Brussels:
 Collegiate Church of Saint Gertrude, Nivelles
Church of Saint Joseph, Waterloo

West Flanders
In the Diocese of Bruges:
Church of Our Lady, Bruges
 St. James's Church, Bruges
 St. Walburga Church (Bruges)
Church of Our Lady (Kortrijk)
Saint Martin's Church (Kortrijk)
 Sint-Petrus-en-Pauluskerk
 St. Vedast Church, Vlamertinge

See also
Catholic Church in Belgium
 List of Christian monasteries in Belgium
Knights of Saint Thomas More

 
Belgium, Catholic
Belgium
Lists of religious buildings and structures in Belgium